Ashurbanipal Ebrahim Babilla (1944–2011) was an Assyrian-Iranian actor, theatre director, playwright and visual artist. Babilla's oeuvre received both critical acclaim as well as criticism. He wrote numerous plays in Persian and English. As a result of the Islamic Revolution, Babilla was forced to flee his native Iran and moved to the United States. In 2005, alongside four other Iranian writers, he received the Hellman-Hammett Award by Human Rights Watch.

Biography
Ashurbanipal Babilla, known as "Bani" to his friends and relatives, was born to Shedrach and Luba Babilla (née Tamraz) in Tehran. His family were Presbyterian Assyrians. Babilla completed his primary and secondary education at the Mehr and Firuz Bahram schools in Tehran, and moved to Beirut afterwards to pursue further education. In 1968 he received his B.A. from the American University of Beirut and in 1971 his M.A. from the Near East School of Theology.

In Beirut, Babilla wrote several plays before returning to Iran in 1972. When he returned to Iran, Babilla at first planned to become a Presbyterian minister. However, according to Khosrow Shayesteh / Encyclopædia Iranica, due to his "radical belief in liberation theology", Babilla was reportedly de facto ousted from the Presbyterian Church by its elders. In 1972–1973, Babilla taught English literature at the Faculty of Literature and Foreign Languages of the University of Tehran. During his time as a teacher, Babilla directed several English plays, which were "produced by the International Theater of Tehran".

Babilla became renowned among Iranian avant-garde artists as a result of the plays he directed. In 1973, he became a member of the Kargah-e Namayesh (Theater Workshop). From 1973 to 1979, Babilla wrote numerous plays in Persian. He also created visual arts. Similar to the works he wrote, Babilla's paintings were deemed controversial. However, the posters Babilla created for his plays were a considered to be success and were named as "among the most progressive theatrical posters in the history of poster in Iran".

In December 1980, as a consequence of the Islamic Revolution, Babilla was forced to flee his native Iran "after almost a year of hiding". He eventually arrived in California, where he directed several plays and taught at University of Southern California. According to Khosrow Shayesteh, a year later, he left California for New York where he lived until his death. In New York, he contributed to the foundation of a "theater troupe", translated plays into Persian, and created "many paintings and sculptures", amongst others. In 1981, Babilla briefly taught at New York University, and from 1989 to 1996 at Bard College.

In an interview, Babilla stated that: "basically, there are three themes in all my work—sex, politics, and religion—and all are inseparable".

Notes

References

Sources
 

1944 births
2011 deaths
Male actors from Tehran
Iranian Assyrian people
20th-century Iranian male actors
20th-century Iranian painters
Iranian emigrants to the United States
Exiles of the Iranian Revolution in the United States
American people of Iranian-Assyrian descent
20th-century American male actors
Iranian dramatists and playwrights
21st-century Iranian male actors
Academic staff of the University of Tehran
American University of Beirut alumni
Assyrian Iranian writers
Assyrian actors
Bard College faculty
21st-century Iranian painters
20th-century American painters
21st-century American painters
20th-century American dramatists and playwrights
21st-century American dramatists and playwrights
Iranian theatre directors
American theatre directors
20th-century Iranian sculptors
21st-century Iranian sculptors
20th-century American sculptors
21st-century American sculptors
New York University faculty
Iranian expatriates in Lebanon